Isabel de Clare, suo jure 4th Countess of Pembroke and Striguil (c. 1172 – 11 March 1220), was an Anglo-Irish noblewoman and one of the wealthiest heiresses in Wales and Ireland. She was the wife of William Marshal, 1st Earl of Pembroke, who served three successive kings as Marshal of England. Her marriage had been arranged by King Richard I.

Family inheritance

Isabel was one of two known legitimate children of Earl Richard "Strongbow". Isabel may have been older than her brother Gilbert, who was born in 1173 but died a teenager soon after 1185, at which point Isabel became the heir to her parents' great estates in England, Wales and Leinster. Her mother was the daughter of Diarmait Mac Murchada, the deposed King of Leinster and Mór ingen Muirchertaig. The latter was a daughter of Muirchertach Ua Tuathail and Cacht ingen Loigsig. The marriage of Strongbow and Aoife took place in August 1170, the day after the capture of Waterford by the Cambro-Norman forces led by Strongbow.

Isabel's paternal grandparents were Gilbert de Clare, 1st Earl of Pembroke, and his wife Isabel de Beaumont. Deprived of his father Gilbert's estate of Pembrokeshire by the king in 1153 when he succeeded as a child, Richard Strongbow continued to assert he was an earl, but took his title as Striguil (the Welsh name for the lordship of Chepstow, the centre of his estates in the southern March of Wales). The earldom of Pembroke was not forgotten, however, and in 1199 it was recreated and awarded to Isabel's husband, William Marshal, undoubtedly on the basis of Isabel's hereditary claim to it. In this way, Isabel could be said to be the successor in the earldom of Pembroke to her grandfather Gilbert, the first earl, especially as her husband before 1199 was meticulous in referring to her as 'Countess Isabel'.

Isabel was described as having been "the good, the fair, the wise, the courteous lady of high degree". She allegedly spoke French, Irish and Latin. After her brother Gilbert's death, Isabel became one of the wealthiest heiresses in the kingdom, owning besides the titles of Pembroke and Striguil, much land in Wales and Ireland. She also had a hereditary claim on the numerous castles on the inlet of Milford Haven, guarding the St George's Channel, including Pembroke Castle. She was a ward of King Henry II, who carefully watched over her inheritance, and who we find in 1189 had confided her to the keeping of Ranulf de Glanville chief justiciar of England.

Marriage 
The new King Richard I arranged her marriage in August 1189 to William Marshal, regarded by many as the greatest knight and soldier in the realm. Henry II had promised Marshal he would be given Isabel as his bride, and his son and successor Richard upheld the promise one month after his accession to the throne. At the time of her marriage, Isabel was residing in the Tower of London in the protective custody of the Justiciar of England, Ranulf de Glanville. Following the wedding, which was celebrated in London "with due pomp and ceremony", they spent their honeymoon at Stoke d'Abernon in Surrey which belonged to Enguerrand d'Abernon.

Marriage to Isabel elevated William Marshal from the status of military captain and knight into one of the richest men in the kingdom. He would serve as Lord Marshal of England, four kings in all: Henry II, Richard I, John, and Henry III. Although Marshal did not become Earl of Pembroke until 1199—a revival of the title by King John as an act of favour—he nevertheless assumed overlordship of Leinster in Ireland and the Marcher lordships of Chepstow and Usk with Isabel's many other estates in several English counties, which belonged to her father's and her own earldom of Striguil.

Marshal and Isabel did not sail to Ireland till 1200, after taking possession of Pembroke. He left her behind him on his return to England. She may have ruled Leinster in his absence till as late as 1203, with as her seneschal a Wiltshire knight, Geoffrey fitz Robert, who was married to Isabel's aunt, Basilia de Clare, a sister of Strongbow. Isabel is credited with playing a major part at this time in the foundation of the borough known as New Ross. Isabel was again left to rule Leinster in 1207-8 during her husband's house arrest at the court of King John when, though pregnant, she successfully led the campaign which defeated the rebel barons of the province.

The marriage was happy, despite the vast difference in age between them. William Marshal and Isabel produced a total of five sons and five daughters.

Widowhood
Isabel lived as a widow for only ten months after the death of William Marshal, though it was by no means an uneventful period, which has left a good deal of evidence as to how a great heiress such as she was, managed her affairs when she came into full control of her inheritance. She wrote within days to the papal legate and the justiciar of England asking for the prompt delivery of her lands, and on 18 June 1219, the justiciar issued writs ordering local officers to hand over, to her, control of her inheritance in four English counties and in Ireland. Pembroke is not mentioned, which hints that her eldest son may have directly inherited the earldom as it may have been treated as a royal grant to his father, not as part of his mother's inheritance. The marcher lordship of Striguil also came to her. In July she was in France, where she successfully negotiated with King Philip Augustus the possession of her Norman inheritance. While there, she and her son opened negotiations with the king for the marriage of the younger William Marshal with his first cousin, a ploy which caused panic at the English court and a counter-offer of marriage to King Henry III's youngest sister Eleanor. There is evidence that she made good use of her eldest son as her agent in managing the great estates that were hers to dispose of in the months she had them, both of them stonewalling her late husband's executors to avoid paying the debts he left. In February 1220 she was mortally ill at Chepstow, and on 2 March her son is found at Cirencester en route to Wales to attend her deathbed. Tintern Abbey sources give her death as 11 March 1220. She was buried in the north choir aisle of the family abbey of Tintern, next to her mother Aoife.

Issue
 William Marshal, 2nd Earl of Pembroke (11906 April 1231). Chief Justiciar of Ireland. He married firstly, Alice de Bethune, and secondly, Eleanor Plantagenet, daughter of King John. 
 Richard Marshal, 3rd Earl of Pembroke (11911 April 1234 Kilkenny Castle, Ireland), married Gervase le Dinant. He died childless.
 Maud Marshal (119227 March 1248). She married firstly, Hugh Bigod, 3rd Earl of Norfolk, by whom she had issue; she married secondly, William de Warenne, 5th Earl of Surrey, by whom she had issue, including John de Warenne, 6th Earl of Surrey who married Alice le Brun de Lusignan; she married thirdly, Walter de Dunstanville. Five queen consorts of Henry VIII: Catherine of Aragon, Anne Boleyn, Jane Seymour, Catherine Howard and Catherine Parr were her descendants.
 Gilbert Marshal, 4th Earl of Pembroke (119427 June 1241). He married firstly, Marjorie of Scotland, daughter of King William I of Scotland; and secondly, Maud de Lanvaley. He is known to have had an illegitimate daughter while a young cleric, whom he married to Maelgwyn Fychan, a prince of the royal house of Deheubarth.
 Walter Marshal, 5th Earl of Pembroke (119624 November 1245). He married Margaret de Quincy, Countess of Lincoln, widow of John de Lacy, 1st Earl of Lincoln, as her second husband. The marriage was childless.
 Anselm Marshal, 6th Earl of Pembroke (119822 December 1245). He married Maud de Bohun. He died childless.
 Isabel Marshal (9 October 120017 January 1240). She married firstly, Gilbert de Clare, 4th Earl of Hertford; and secondly, Richard, 1st Earl of Cornwall. She had issue by both marriages. King Robert I of Scotland and Queen consorts Anne Boleyn, Jane Seymour, Catherine Howard and Catherine Parr were descendants.
  Sibyl Marshal (1201before 1238), married William de Ferrers, 5th Earl of Derby, by whom she had issue. Queen consort Catherine Parr was a descendant.
 Joan Marshal (1202–1234), married Warin de Munchensi, Lord of Swanscombe, by whom she had issue. Both queen consorts Jane Seymour and Catherine Parr were descendants.
 Eva Marshal (1203–1246), married William de Braose (died 1230). Queen consorts Anne Boleyn, Jane Seymour, Catherine Howard, and Catherine Parr were her descendants.

Legacy 
A cenotaph was discovered inside St. Mary's Church, New Ross, Ireland, whose slab bears the partial inscription "ISABEL: LAEGEN" (interpreted as 'Isabel of Leinster') and an engraved likeness said to be hers. This identification was subsequently rejected, even before modern research identified her true burial place at Tintern 

It was suggested in 1892 by Paul Meyer that Isabel might have encouraged the composition of the Song of Dermot, which narrates the exploits of her father and maternal grandfather. The Deeds of the Normans in Ireland as it is now known is dated by its latest editor to the 1190s, so Meyer's suggestion is possible. However the text makes no mention of either Isabel or her husband, and is more likely to have been sponsored within the community of barons of Leinster at a time before Isabel and William Marshal effectively exercised their lordship in Ireland in 1200.

Although her daughters had many children, Isabel's five sons, curiously, died childless, apart from Gilbert, who before he inherited the earldom had an illegitimate daughter whom he married off to a son of the Welsh lord Maelgwyn Fychan in 1240. This failure in heirs is supposedly attributed to a curse placed upon William Marshal by the Irish Bishop of Ferns, Albin O'Molloy. The title of marshal subsequently passed to Hugh de Bigod, husband of Isabel's eldest daughter Maud, while the title of Earl of Pembroke went to William de Valence, 1st Earl of Pembroke, the husband of Joan de Munchensi, daughter of Joan Marshal. He was the first of the de Valence line of the earls of Pembroke.

Within a few generations their descendants included much of the nobility of Europe, including all the monarchs of Scotland since Robert I (1274–1329) and all those of England, Great Britain and the United Kingdom since Henry IV (1367–1413); and Katherine of Aragon and all of the English queen consorts of Henry VIII.

Ancestry

References

Sources
 
 
 
 
 Gillian Kenny. "The Wife's Tale: Isabel Marshal and Ireland", William Marshal and Ireland, ed. J. Bradley and others (Dublin: Four Courts, 2017), pp. 315–24.
 Linda E. Mitchell, "The Most Perfect Knight's Countess, Isabella de Clare, her daughters and women's exercise of power", Medieval Elite Women and the Exercise of Power, 1100–1400, ed. H. Tanner (Palgrave Macmillan, 2019), pp. 45–65.

1172 births
1220 deaths
Isabel de Clare
Pembroke
Daughters of British earls
People from County Wexford
12th-century Irish people
13th-century Irish people
13th-century Irish women
12th-century Irish women
12th-century English people
12th-century English women
12th-century Welsh people
12th-century Welsh women
Wives of knights